Netherlands Antilles Championship or Kopa Antiano was the premier association football competition in the Netherlands Antilles, overseen by the Nederlands Antilliaanse Voetbal Unie.

The championship was contested by the top teams of the Curaçao League and the Bonaire League. Up to and including 1985, the top clubs from Aruba also entered in this championship. The last tournament was played in 2010 due to the dissolution of the Netherlands Antilles.

Netherlands Antilles Championship - 2007/08
C.S.D. Barber   (CUR)
UNDEBA (CUR)
SV Juventus (BON)
Real Rincon (BON)

Previous winners

1961 : RKSV SITHOC (CUR)
1962 : RKSV SITHOC (CUR)
1963-64 :  not known
1965 : RCA (ARU)
1966 : CRKSV Jong Colombia (CUR)
1967 : RKSV Scherpenheuvel (CUR)
1968 : CRKSV Jong Colombia (CUR)
1969 : S.V. SUBT (CUR)
1970 : Estrella (ARU)
1971-72 :  not known
1973 : CRKSV Jong Colombia (CUR)
1974 : CRKSV Jong Colombia (CUR)
1975-76  : not known
1977 : CRKSV Jong Holland (CUR)
1978 : CRKSV Jong Colombia (CUR)
1979 : not known
1980 : S.V. SUBT (CUR)
1982-84 :  not known
1985 : UNDEBA  (CUR)
1986 : not known
1987 : UNDEBA (CUR)
1988-89 : not known
1989-90 : UNDEBA (CUR)
1991-92 : not known
1992-93 : RKSV SITHOC  (CUR)
1994-95 : not known
1996-97 : UNDEBA  (CUR)
1997 : CRKSV Jong Colombia  (CUR)
1998-99 : RKSV SITHOC (CUR)
2000-01 : CRKSV Jong Colombia  (CUR)
2001-02 : C.S.D. Barber (CUR)
2002-03 : C.S.D. Barber (CUR)
2003-04 : C.S.D. Barber (CUR)
2004-05 : C.S.D. Barber (CUR)
2005-06 : C.S.D. Barber (CUR)
2006-07 : C.S.D. Barber (CUR)
2007-08 : C.S.D. Barber (CUR)
2008-09 : S.V. Hubentut Fortuna (CUR)
2009-10 : C.S.D. Barber (CUR)

Performance by club

References
Kampioenschap van de Nederlandse Antillen op RSSSF

Football competitions in the Netherlands Antilles
Defunct top level association football leagues